Akapei Latu (born November 3, 1978) is a Tongan judoka, who competed in the men's lightweight category. Latu qualified as a lone judoka for the Tongan squad in the men's lightweight class (73 kg) at the 2004 Summer Olympics in Athens, by granting a tripartite invitation from the International Judo Federation. He received a bye in the opening round, before losing out in his first match to Algeria's Noureddine Yagoubi, who pinned and subdued him on the tatami with a kuchiki taoshi (single leg takedown) assault at three minutes and seven seconds.

References

External links
 

1978 births
Living people
Tongan male judoka
Olympic judoka of Tonga
Judoka at the 2004 Summer Olympics
People from Nukuʻalofa